This is a list of Major League Baseball (MLB) players to have accumulated a value of 50 or more career Wins Above Replacement (bWAR). As of the end of the 2022 Major League Baseball season, 314 players have reached a WAR value of 50 or higher, as detailed in this list. 

Babe Ruth is the all-time leader in WAR with a value of 183.1.

Key

List
Stats updated as of October 7, 2022

See also

 Wins Above Replacement
 Sabermetrics

Sources

Wins Above Replacement leaders